FC Struga Trim-Lum (FK Struga Trim-Lum) is a football club based in Struga, North Macedonia. They are currently competing in the Macedonian First League.

History
The club was founded in 2015 participating in the 4th Macedonian Football Division and winning it in the 2015–16 season gaining promotion in the Macedonian Third League.

In the 2016–17 season the club finished first place in the Third League which allowed them to directly gaining promotion in the Macedonian Second League and also winning the Cup of OFS Struga.

On 28 November 2017 they won Independence Cup a competition which took place in Korçë, Albania. In the semi-finals they were won against KF Tirana (1–0) with a header scored from Migjen Sherifi and in the final they were won against KF Otranti from Ulcinj after the penalty shootout (4–1).

Recent seasons

1The 2019–20 season was abandoned due to the COVID-19 pandemic in North Macedonia.

European record

As of match played 15 July 2021

Notes
 QR: Qualifying round

Players

Current squad

Out on loan

Personnel

References

External links
FC Struga Facebook 
Club info at MacedonianFootball 
Football Federation of Macedonia 

Football clubs in North Macedonia
Association football clubs established in 2015
2015 establishments in the Republic of Macedonia
FC
Struga